Leppneeme is a village in Viimsi Parish, Harju County in northern Estonia. As of 2011 Census, the settlement's population was 464.

Leppneeme harbour is the main point for traffic to and from the island of Prangli. The corresponding harbour on Prangli's side is in Kelnase.

Leppneeme was first mentioned in 1376 as Thusnes.

References

Villages in Harju County
Kreis Harrien